James Andrew Clarkson (born 6 March 1972) is an English-American football coach and former player who was most recently the head coach of Houston Dash in the National Women's Soccer League (NWSL).

Career
He previously served as academy director for Houston Dynamo as well as head coach of Dynamo PDL affiliate Brazos Valley Cavalry FC. On 11 December 2018, Clarkson was announced as the head coach of the Houston Dash.

On 26 April 2022, Clarkson was suspended by the NWSL pending the completion of an investigation into abuse by multiple league personnel. On 9 January 2023, the NWSL announced that his return to the league was conditioned on the completion of anti-harassment training.

Personal life
Clarkson lives in Houston with his wife, Lizz, and two sons, Jack and William. He obtained American citizenship on 3 May 2013.

Managerial honours
 NWSL Challenge Cup
 Winners: 2020
 NWSL Community Shield
 Runners-up: 2020

References

1972 births
Living people
Houston Dash coaches
English expatriate football managers
English expatriate sportspeople in the United States
Expatriate soccer managers in the United States
Naturalized citizens of the United States
National Women's Soccer League coaches
People from Wisbech
Sportspeople from Cambridgeshire
English football managers